Greek Tragedy is a 1989 play by British playwright Mike Leigh.The play was originally presented at Company B Belvoir Street Theatre, Sydney Australia. It was devised by Mike Leigh with six Australian actors who were chosen after extensive auditions. The actors were Zoe Carides, Khristina Totos, Stan Kouros, George Spartels, Evodkia Katahanas and Nicholas Papademetriou. The production was a landmark production for Company B as it is the only play to be devised by Mike Leigh in Australia. It was one of the biggest successes of the theatre year and was subsequently invited to do seasons at the Edinburgh Festival and London's Theatre Royal Stratford East in 1990. In 2002 the play was remounted by TheatronGroup with some of the original cast, plus Elena Carapetis, Deborah Galanos and Adam Hatz, in the Downstairs Theatre of Belvoir Street Theatre. The play runs for one hour and twenty minutes without an interval and concerns the troubled relationship of a Greek couple Alex and Calliope.

Plays by Mike Leigh
1989 plays